The Good House is a 2022 American comedy-drama film directed by Maya Forbes and Wally Wolodarsky, who wrote the screenplay with Thomas Bezucha. It is based on the novel of the same name by Ann Leary.

It is the final Amblin Partners film to be produced under the Participant label for social justice content (since Participant terminated its equity stake in Amblin Partners, ending its relationship with the company on November 30, 2020).

Plot 
Hildy Good, once the most prosperous realtor in Wendover, has fallen on hard times following her divorce and family's insistence she went to rehab for alcoholism. Her former assistant, Wendy, also stole her clients while she was in rehab, adding to her problems. Hildy attempts to aid a local family with an autistic child sell their home, so they can move and enroll him in a special school by getting her former boyfriend, Frank, to renovate their home. She renews her relationship with Frank, but the home sale falls through, and she finds out her former clients yet again are stolen by Wendy. 

Hildy befriends a woman, Rebecca, who she sold a house to her and her husband and is then drawn into her life. She discovers Rebecca and the local psychologist, Peter, are having an affair, but she promises she won't reveal their secret. Hildy continues to drink in solitude instead of in the open, justifying her drinking by saying she just needs to take the edge off and that she doesn't "need" to drink. Peter approaches her about selling his home, but says it's not set in stone and not to speak of it, Hildy assumes this means he will be asking for a divorce. Hildy decides not to drink anymore after one night when she is cornered in the cellar and drinks two bottles of wine. She avoids alcohol for quite a while, and then finds out that Peter is selling his home and using Wendy instead of her. She confronts him and says he will destroy her career if he gives this sale to Wendy, so she threatens him with the information she has about him and Rebecca. Hildy is able to sell his home, then uses that sale to snag the large estate the Santorelli brothers built in Wendover. She celebrates with them, taking her first sip of alcohol in a while, and then can't stop. She drives drunk to Frank's house, telling him they need to celebrate, and Frank takes her keys and offers to drive her home. She gets angry and refuses, saying she'd rather walk. 

The next day, she is woken by Frank, and he shows her the car in her driveway with a damaged front end; she had walked back to his house after getting the spare key and driven home. The autistic son of her friends is missing, and they fear the worst. Frank hides her car, then leaves to help with the search, while Hildy goes to the kitchen to take a drink when Peter walks in dripping wet. They have a conversation where he says the missing boy is fine, but she needs to get control. Suddenly, he disappears and Hildy hears her oldest daughter in the house, so they go to help with the search. The police find a body in the water, but it ends up being Peter, meaning Hildy had hallucinated her talk with him, and she collapses, begging for help. Jake, the autistic boy, is found safe by Rebecca and is led home. Hildy willingly goes into rehab this time and accepts that she does have a drinking problem, and the movie closes with her and Frank sailing on the boat he made for her when they were young.

Cast 
 Sigourney Weaver as Hildy Good
 Kevin Kline as Frank Getchell
 Morena Baccarin as Rebecca McAllister
 Rob Delaney as Peter Newbold
 Beverly D'Angelo as Mamie Lang
 David Rasche as Scott Good
 Rebecca Henderson as Tess Good
 Molly Brown as Emily Good
 Kelly AuCoin as Brian McAllister
 Kathryn Erbe as Wendy Heatherton
 Paul Guilfoyle as Henry Barlow

Production 
It was announced on September 23, 2019 that filming had begun in Canada on the project. Maya Forbes and Wally Wolodarsky were directing the film in addition to writing the screenplay, and Sigourney Weaver and Kevin Kline cast to star. Morena Baccarin, Rob Delaney, Beverly D'Angelo, David Rasche, and Rebecca Henderson were added to the cast the next month. On November 5, 2019, Kelly AuCoin and Kathryn Erbe joined the cast of the film.

Release 
The film had its world premiere at the 2021 Toronto International Film Festival on September 15, 2021. Originally, Universal Pictures was set to distribute in the United States and some other international territories, but the film's U.S. rights were later said to be on sale. On June 13, 2022, days before the film's premiere at the Tribeca Film Festival on June 18, Lionsgate and Roadside Attractions acquired North American rights to the film. Following the film's premiere at Tribeca, it was released on September 30 the same year.

The film was released for VOD on October 18, 2022, followed by a Blu-ray and DVD release on November 22, 2022.

Reception 
On the review aggregator website Rotten Tomatoes, The Good House holds an approval rating of 73% based on 78 reviews with an average of 6.1/10. The website's critics consensus reads: "The Good House creaks in spots, but with Kevin Kline and Sigourney Weaver providing load-bearing performances, it's far from a fixer-upper." On Metacritic, which uses a weighted average, the films has a score of 62 out 100 based on 16 reviews, indicating "generally positive reviews".

References

External links 
 

2021 films
2021 comedy-drama films
American comedy-drama films
Films produced by Robert De Niro
Films directed by Wallace Wolodarsky
Films scored by Theodore Shapiro
Films with screenplays by Thomas Bezucha
Films with screenplays by Wallace Wolodarsky
Films shot in Nova Scotia
DreamWorks Pictures films
FilmNation Entertainment films
Lionsgate films
Roadside Attractions films
2020s English-language films
2020s American films